Bank Islam Malaysia Berhad (Jawi: بڠك اسلام مليسيا برحد) is an Islamic bank based in Malaysia that has been in operation since July 1983. Bank Islam was established primarily to assist the financial needs of the country's Muslim population, and extended its services to the broader population. The bank currently provides Sharia-compliant card services and mobile banking.

Subsidiaries
 BIMB Investment Management Bhd
 BIMB Securities Sdn Bhd
 Al-Wakalah Nominees (Tempatan) Sdn Bhd
 Bank Islam Trust Company (Labuan) Ltd
 Farihan Corporation Sdn Bhd

References

External links 

 

1983 establishments in Malaysia
Banks established in 1983
Malaysian companies established in 1983
BIMB Holdings
Islamic banks of Malaysia
Companies listed on Bursa Malaysia